The Canton of Wingles is a canton of France, located in the Pas-de-Calais department, in the Hauts-de-France region.

Communes
At the French canton reorganisation which came into effect in March 2015, the canton was expanded from 5 to 9 communes:
Bénifontaine
Estevelles
Grenay
Hulluch
Loos-en-Gohelle
Meurchin
Pont-à-Vendin
Vendin-le-Vieil
Wingles

See also 
 Cantons of the Pas-de-Calais department

References

Wingles